Saint-Sornin is a commune in the Allier department in Auvergne-Rhône-Alpes in central France.

Population

Sights
Church Saint-Saturnin which is a 14th-century and 19th-century building.
Castle of Montbillon, which is a 17th-century and 19th-century building.

Pond of La Goutte belonged to the Castle of Saint-Hubert in Chavenon

See also
Bourbonnais
Communes of the Allier department

References

Communes of Allier
Allier communes articles needing translation from French Wikipedia